Los Milagros  is a corregimiento in La Mesa District, Veraguas Province, Panama with a population of 1,096 as of 2010. It was created by Law 27 of June 5, 2002.

References

Corregimientos of Veraguas Province